Driouch (Tarifit: Ddriwec, ⴷⴷⵔⵉⵡⴻⵛ; Arabic: الدريوش) is a town in Morocco and the capital of Driouch Province. According to the 2004 census, the town has a population of 14,000.

References

Populated places in Driouch Province
Provincial capitals in Morocco